Sugaya (written: 菅谷 or すがや in hiragana) is a Japanese surname. 

Notable people with the surname include:

, Japanese voice actress;
, Japanese manga artist; and
, Japanese singer and idol.

Fictional characters
, a character in the manga series Assassination Classroom

See also
, train station in Tamura, Fukushima Prefecture, Japan

Japanese-language surnames